Kallmeyer is a German surname.  Notable people with the surname include:

Helmut Kallmeyer (1910–2006), German chemist and Action T4 perpetrator
Minnie Kallmeyer (1882–1947), American-born Canadian artist

German-language surnames